Lepidozia azorica is a species of liverwort in the family Lepidoziaceae. It is found on mainland Portugal and Spain and on the Canary Islands.

References

Lepidoziaceae
Least concern plants
Taxonomy articles created by Polbot